Gary L. Gottlieb (born in Brooklyn, NY, in May, 1955), is a prominent psychiatrist, healthcare executive and healthcare investor who served as CEO of Partners in Health from 2015-2019.

In the 1990s and early 2000s, Gottlieb established, chaired, or led various medical centers and departments. From 2010 to 2015, he was president and CEO of Partners HealthCare. He is the only person to appear eight consecutive times in Modern Healthcare magazine's list of the "50 Most Influential Physician Executives in Healthcare."

Gottlieb earned a BS from the Rensselaer Polytechnic Institute, an MD from the Albany Medical College of Union University, and an MBA from the Wharton School of the University of Pennsylvania. He is a professor of psychiatry at Harvard Medical School and a member of the National Academy of Medicine. Gottlieb is also an executive partner of digital health venture capital firm Flare Capital Partners in Boston, MA. He served as a member of the board of directors of the Federal Reserve Bank of Boston from 2012 to 2016 and as its chair from 2016 to 2018. He currently serves on the external advisory board of the University of Pennsylvania's Center for Health Incentives and Behavioral Economics (CHIBE). 

He and his wife Derri Shtasel, a psychiatrist, have two children: a son, Corey; and a daughter, Zoe.

References

1955 births
American psychiatrists
Harvard Medical School faculty
American health care chief executives
Living people
Rensselaer Polytechnic Institute alumni
Wharton School of the University of Pennsylvania alumni
Members of the National Academy of Medicine